The 1998–99 season was the 67th season in the existence of FC Metz and the club's 32nd consecutive season in the top-flight of French football. In addition to the domestic league, Metz participated in this season's editions of the Coupe de France, the Coupe de la Ligue, the UEFA Champions League and UEFA Cup.

Season summary
Last season, Metz had only been denied their first ever French title by goal difference. This season, however, the club endured humiliating exits from the Champions League and the UEFA Cup and dropped down to 10th in the final table. The closest the club came to glory was reaching the Coupe de la Ligue final, but they were defeated 1-0 by Lens.

Players
Squad at end of season

Left club during season

Competitions

Overview

Division 1

League table

Results summary

Results by match

Matches

Source:

Coupe de France

Coupe de la Ligue

Champions League

Second qualifying round

UEFA Cup

First round

Notes and references

Notes

References

FC Metz seasons
Metz